San José de Carrasco is a residential neighbourhood and resort of Ciudad de la Costa in Canelones, Uruguay.

Geography

Location
This resort is located on the western area of Ciudad de la Costa, between the kilometers 20 and 21 on the Avenida Luis Giannattasio (Giannattasio Avenue) from the centre of Montevideo. Its limits are:  Cruz del Sur street on the west, which separates San José de Carrasco from Shangrila neighborhood; Buenos Aires street on the east, which separates it from Lagomar neighborhood; Rio de la Plata on the south, and Ruta Interbalnearia on the north.

Population
In 2011 San José de Carrasco had a population of 7,288.

Source: Instituto Nacional de Estadística de Uruguay

Transport
The Coastal Avenue (Rambla Costanera) is divided by the long Avenida Luis Giannattasio, along which are concentrated the main commercial and service activities of the place. On the northern rim of the resort is the west-east Ruta Interbalnearia.

Places of worship
 Parish Church of St. Mary of the Angels (Roman Catholic, Pallottines)

Street map

References

External links
INE map of Colonia Nicolich, Paso Carrasco, Carrasco Int.Airport, and parts of the municipality of Ciudad de la Costa (incl. San José de Carrasco)

Ciudad de la Costa